Brunei competed in the 2010 Commonwealth Games held in Delhi. The country competed in lawn bowling only.

Lawn bowls

Brunei has sent a team of 11 lawn bowlers to the 2010 Commonwealth games 

Men

Women

See also
2010 Commonwealth Games

References

External links
  Times of india

Brunei at the Commonwealth Games
Nations at the 2010 Commonwealth Games
Comm